Drzeńsko may refer to the following places:
Drzeńsko, Lubusz Voivodeship (west Poland)
Drzeńsko, Drawsko County in West Pomeranian Voivodeship (north-west Poland)
Drzeńsko, Sławno County in West Pomeranian Voivodeship (north-west Poland)